

Results

References
 Official results

Team event